The Chile national beach soccer team represents Chile in international beach soccer competitions and is controlled by the FFC, the governing body for football in Chile.

Current squad
Correct as of March 2018

Current staff
 Manager: Miguel Ángel Gamboa
 Technical Assistant: Miguel Ángel Gamboa
 Head Delegation: Felipe Fernández

Achievements
FIFA Beach Soccer World Cup Best: Ninth Place
1998
Stefani Dell voted team Captain ~ 2009
Copa Latina Best: Champions
2010

References

External links
BSWW Profile

South American national beach soccer teams
Beach Soccer